Marta Dusseldorp (born 1 February 1973) is an Australian stage, film and theatre actress. Her television credits include BlackJack, Crownies (and its spin-off Janet King), Jack Irish and A Place to Call Home.

Early life and education
Dusseldorp is the granddaughter of Dutch-born engineer Dick Dusseldorp, the founder of Lend Lease Corporation. Her maternal grandfather was Sandy Robertson, a Sydney paediatrician. She attended Ascham School and then Geelong Grammar School, graduating in 1990, and the University of New South Wales, where she majored in theatre and film for two years. She then went on to study at the Victorian College of the Arts in Melbourne.

Career
Dusseldorp played the character of Janet King in the 2011 ABC1 drama series Crownies, a role she reprised in the 2014 spin-off Janet King. She is also known for the telemovie series BlackJack (2003–2007) as Sam Lawson and the 2012 Jack Irish telemovie series as Linda Hillier. She has appeared in guest roles on television series such as All Saints. She had a starring role in the series A Place to Call Home, which ran from 2013 until 2018.

She won the award for Best Female Actor in a Supporting Role in a Play in the 2009 Helpmann Awards for her performance as Queen Margaret in Benedict Andrews' The War of the Roses with the Sydney Theatre Company. Dusseldorp returned to the stage in 2016 in the premiere of Benedict Andrews' play Gloria with the Griffin Theatre Company. In November 2017, Dusseldorp and her husband Ben Winspear played the couple in Joanna Murray-Smith's stage adaptation of Scenes from a Marriage for the Queensland Theatre Company. In 2020 she played the role of Erica Bowden in the romantic comedy Ellie & Abbie (& Ellie's Dead Aunt).

Personal life
Dusseldorp is married to fellow actor Ben Winspear, and they have two children.

She is an ambassador for Save the Children Australia and Australia for UNHCR.

Dusseldorp was the subject of an episode of the television genealogical documentary series Who Do You Think You Are? that first screened on SBS on 14 May 2019.

Filmography

Films

Television

References

External links

Marta Dusseldorp on Twitter 
Marta Dusseldorp on Instagram 

Living people
1973 births
AACTA Award winners
Australian film actresses
Australian people of Dutch descent
Australian stage actresses
Australian television actresses
Helpmann Award winners
Place of birth missing (living people)
University of New South Wales alumni
Victorian College of the Arts alumni
20th-century Australian actresses
21st-century Australian actresses